Abdur Rahman (born 21 February 1990) is a Bangladeshi first-class cricketer who plays for Rangpur Division.

See also
 List of Rangpur Division cricketers

References

External links
 

1990 births
Living people
Bangladeshi cricketers
Rangpur Division cricketers
People from Rangpur District